Bajk (also known as Bajg) is a village in Rahdar Rural District, in the Central District of Rudan County, Hormozgan Province, Iran. At the 2006 census, its population was 122, in 24 families.

References 

Populated places in Rudan County